Liberty Mya Yin (21 April 1904 – 29 April 1945) was a Burmese anyeint dancer and singer, best known during the pre-World War II period. She gained the moniker "Liberty" from college fans who advocated Burmese independence.

A bronze bust of Mya Yin stands before the National Theatre of Mandalay.

Life
Mya Yin was born to Po Thit and Nyanyon, who were both traditional dancers, on 21 April, 1904 at Shwepalagan village, Thazi Township (now Wundwin Township), British Burma. She started dancing at age 15. Awba Thaung was one of her contemporaries.

She was secretly married to Mahn Nyut U Maung Galay, a wealthy businessman and MP in the Legislative Council of Burma.

Later career
Mya Yin's popularity was universal, including the general public, government officials and the elite. At one point her anyeint had to be booked and partially paid for a year in advance, and donors needed to choose their days depending on when she was free. Among her admirers were Sir Joseph Augustus Maung Gyi and U Thant.

She performed hundreds of songs; some of the best known were "Tone Kyaw Ma", "U Thawun Kyaung", "Ahlushin" and "Shwe Pyi Soe". She also produced gramophone records, including "Moonlight Glory", "Padonma Shwekyar", "Khint Thabaw", "Maung Maung's Shwekye", "Htin Thalone" and "Okay, Sait Taku Yote Koze".

Death and legacy
Mya Yin died on 29 April 1945 of malaria while fleeing conflict in Burma during World War II.

In recognition of her prominence as a Burmese artist, a bronze statue of her stands before the National Theatre of Mandalay.

Notes

See also
 Burmese dance
 Anyeint
 Sin Kho Ma Lay
 Yindaw Ma Lay
 Ma Htwe Lay
 Aung Bala
 Awba Thaung
 Mya Chay Gyin Ma Ngwe Myaing

References

Burmese dancers
20th-century Burmese women singers
1904 births
1945 deaths
Date of birth unknown
Civilians killed in World War II
Deaths from malaria
Infectious disease deaths in Myanmar